Venice 24/7 is a British documentary series about the emergency services in Venice. It is shown on BBC Four and comprises six episodes.

Episode list

External links

2012 British television series debuts
BBC television documentaries
Television shows set in Venice